Transbaikal State University is an institution of higher education in Chita, Russia. It is the largest educational, scientific and innovative center in Zabaykalsky Krai. Transbaikal State University (until 2011: Chita State University) was established in 1974 on the base of the Technology Department of Irkutsk Technical Institute which was opened earlier in 1966.

Now the university comprises eight schools: the School of Mining, the School of Power Engineering, the School of Construction and Ecology, the School of Law, the School of Social and Political Systems, the School of Economics and Management, the School of Technological and Transportation Systems, and the School of Adult Education and Refresher Courses.

History

1966 – The Technology Department of Irkutsk Technical Institute was established in Chita.
1967 – First groups of full-time students were admitted. First programs were taught in the fields of mechanical engineering, civil engineering, metal cutting machinery.
1972 – the Technology Department was transformed into the Chita Branch of Irkutsk Technical Institute.
1974 – Chita Technical Institute was founded.
1995 – The institute was licensed by the State Committee for High Education to train students in 15 fields of science and technology.
1995 – Chita Technical Institute was granted the status of Chita State Technical University. A number of human sciences programs were opened. Specialized Academic Council for Ph.D. Dissertations Defending was established.
1997 – Specialized Academic Council for Doctoral Dissertations Defending was established.
1998 – The Mining Department was reorganized into the School of Mining
2000 – University departments were reorganized into Schools as follows:
 School of Construction and Ecology;
 School of Power Engineering;
 School of Economics, Management and Law;
 School of Technological and Transport Systems
 Doctoral Course was opened.
2003 – the university was granted the status of classical university and given the name of Chita State University. The School of Economics and Management and the School of Law were established. Specialized Academic Councils for Ph.D. Dissertations defending in the field of Philosophy and Geoecology were established.
2004 – Specialized Academic Council for Ph.D. Dissertations defending in the field of Political Studies was established.
2011 - University has been renamed as Transbaikal State University.

Administration and Organization

School of Power Engineering

The School of Power Engineering was established in 2000 as result of the reorganization of the Faculty of Power Engineering of the former Chita Technical Institute.

The main fields of scientific research of the School are the following: energy efficiency upgrading of combined heat and power stations machinery, energy saving during the process of its generation and consumption, reduction of heat and power stations' hazardous emissions, drinking water purification and sewage treatment, electronic communication development of economy and education. The School staff has taken an active part in the Chita Power Supply 2001-2002 Program development and realization, as well as in many other regional programs and researches. Their activity is highly valued by city government.

The School comprises two faculties:
1. The Faculty of Power Technology, which includes:
 Department of Chemistry;
 Department of Physics;
 Department of Power Supply;
 Department of Heat and Power Stations;
 Department of Electrical Engineering, Automation and Electromechanics.
2. The Faculty of Computer Science and Economics, which comprises:
 Department of Computer Science;
 Department of Applied Informatics;
 Department of Power Enterprise Economics and Management;
 Department of Mathematics;
 Department of Descriptive Geometry and Technical Drawing;

The School offers post-graduate programs in:
- Mathematical Analysis
- Colloid Chemistry and Physicochemical Mechanics
- Power Stations and Electric Power Systems
- Heat and Power Stations and their Power Systems and Units
- Power Plant Economics and Management

School of Economics and Management
The School of Economics and Management was established in 2003 on the basis of the Faculty of Management of Chita State University.

The School structure comprises two faculties:
1. The Faculty of Economics consists of:
 Department of Political Science and Management;
 Department of Economics;
 Department of Economical Theory.
2. The Faculty of Humanities, which consists of:
 Department of Oriental (Chinese) Studies;
 Department of American Studies;
 Department of Philosophy;
 Department of Social Anthropology, Cultural Science and Philosophy;
 Department of Theoretical and Applied Linguistics.

The School of Economics and Management contributes to the university's international relations development. The students of the School go for practice to China, South Korea, England, Germany, Scotland, and Malta annually. Besides, there is an exchange of students between ChSU and some universities of China. The scientists of the School collaborate with Russian, Chinese, Mongolian, Canadian, French, English, and South Korean researchers and experts.

The School of Mining
The Mining School was established in 1998 on the basis of the Department of Mineral Deposits Exploitation of the Chita Division of Irkutsk Technical Institute. Today the School is one of the biggest centers for training engineers of underground and opencast exploitation of mineral deposits.

The School of Mining comprises two faculties:
1. The Faculty of Mining consisting of:
 Opencast mining;
 Underground exploitation of mineral deposits;
 Mineral and Secondary Raw Materials Processing;
2. The Faculty of Geology consisting of:
 Hydrogeology and engineering geology;
 Geophysics;
 Mining Practice Economics.

The School conducts research work in the following fields: improvement of mining technology, exploration of mineral deposits, environmental safety. Significant research work that had been done has led to the formation of the Scientific Research School, which meets the modern requirements of the mining industry and environmental safety of the region. During many years of activity the students and teachers of the School obtained over 100 mechanical patents and inventor's certificates. There is a Specialized Academic Council for Ph.D. Dissertations and Doctoral Dissertations Defending.

School of Construction and Ecology
The School of Construction and Ecology was established in 1999 as result of the reorganization of the Faculty of Civil Engineering, founded in 1972 on the basis of the Chita Branch of Irkutsk Technical Institute.

The school has two faculties: 
1. Faculty of Civil Engineering consisting of four departments:
 Department of Construction Technology and Production;
 Department of Building Structures and Materials;
 Department of Strength of Materials and Soil Mechanics;
 Department of Theory of Mechanics;
2. Ecological Faculty consisting of three departments:
 Department of Water Resources Management and Environmental Protection;
 Department of Human Safety;
 Department of Land Reclamation, and Conservation.

The school offers post-graduate the following programs:
- Building materials and Products;
- Geoecology;
- Geotechnology;
- Theoretical mechanics;
- Construction Technology and Organisation.
- Geo-technology
- Geo-ecology

The officials of the Vostok Scientific Research Institute of Complex Water Resources Exploitation and Protection (Vostok SRICWREP) established on the basis of the Water Economy and Engineering Ecology department, solve various actual scientific and technical problems concerning Water Economy. They take part in the realization of such programs as Drinking Water, Protection Against Floods in Chita and Amur Regions, and also in the conception of the state territorial program of Chita region's reservoirs' exploitation, restoration and protection.

School of Technological and Transport Systems
The School of Technological and Transportation Systems of Chita State University was established in June 2000 on the basis of the Mechanical and Machine - Building Faculty of the former Chita State Technical University.
Today the School is one of the biggest educational and scientific centers for training engineers, carrying on research in the field of design and technology development for machine - building and motor transport in Zabaykalsky Krai.

The school has two Faculties:
1. Technological Faculty consisting of:
 Department of Machine-Building Technology;
 Department of Production Processes Management;
 Department of Machine-Building Products Design;
 Department of Physics and Communication Techniques;
 Department of Machine-Building Economy and Management.
2. Automobile Transportation consisting of:
 Department of Automobile Transportation;
 Department of Construction Site Engines, Road Construction Machines and Equipment;
 Department of Transportation and Technology Systems Management.

The school has post-graduate courses to carry on research in the sphere of:
- Machine Engineering Technology;
- Hoisting and Road-Building Machinery.

Transbaikal Center of International Association of Automobile and Traffic Training, the educational scientific center "Machine-Builder (engineer)", the educational and scientific center of the department of Motor Transport Management, and the laboratory of 3-D objects computer analysis are established at the School.
School scholars carry on research aimed at solving production problems which have occurred at many important city enterprises. Today the results obtained are evaluated not only by Russian scientists, but also by those from Germany, China, and Japan.

The School of Social and Political Systems

The School comprises two faculties:
1. Socio-Psychological Faculty comprising the following departments:
 Department of Social Policy;
 Department of Psychology;
 Department of Foreign Languages.

2. The Faculty of Social Systems and Regional Forecasting includes:
 Department of Sociology and Philosophy of Law;
 Department of Theoretical Sociology;
 Department of History.

The School serves as the base for many research centers and workgroups. The School has contracts and collaborates with the universities of such cities as Astrakhan, Birobidzhan, Moscow, Novosibirsk, and Cheboksary.
The School offers a post-graduate course on "Vocational Training Theory and Methodology". A post-graduate course on "Common Psychology" is expected to be established in the nearest future.
Nowadays the School of Social and Political Systems is a center of scientific psychological and sociological research.

School of Law
The School of Law was established in September 2003, on the basis of the School of Economy, Management and Law.

The structure of the School comprises two faculties:
1. The Faculty of Law, comprising departments as follows:
 Department of Criminal Law and Practice;
 Department of Civil Law and Process;
 Department of Theory of State and Law.

2. The faculty of International Law comprising the following departments:
 Department of Public and International Law and Foreign Affairs;
 Department of Administrative Law and Customs;
 Department of A branch of Moscow State Institute of International Relations' UNESCO-supported Center for Department of Democracy and Human Rights

The staff of the School takes an active part in the realization of a number of international legal programs; cooperate with the Human Rights Department of UNESCO. There are several legal and criminalistic laboratories based on the departments of the School.

Post-graduate courses include the following: "Criminal Law and Criminology", "Criminal and Executive Law".

Academics and Research

Research Centers

 Geological Research Center
 Research Center for Innovative Technology
 Analytical Science Social Service
 Scientific Technical Center "Economical Problems of Nature Management"
 Educational and Scientific Centre "Mashinostroitel"
 Institute of Natural Resources, Environment and Cryology of Siberian Branch of the Russian Academy of Sciences 
 Zabaikalsky Research Center for Forecasting Regional Development
 Scientific and Methodological Center for Youth
 Service Center Electricity Department for the Implementation, Commissioning and Repair of Electrical Energy-Saving Equipment
 International Centre for Languages and Cultures Chita State University and Dalian University of Foreign Languages
 International Research and Educational Center for Research in the Field of Ethnology and Anthropology
 Eastern Research Center
 Student Research Center for Ethnological Laboratory (ethnographic) Research
 Center for Information Technologies in Economics and Management
 Higher School of Economics, Management and Entrepreneurship

Laboratories

 Multimedia Laboratory, School of Power Engineering
 Scientific and Analytical Laboratory, School of Mining
 Research laboratory "Health saving technologies in higher education"
 Laboratory of Chemical Analysis, School of Power Engineering
 Centre for Innovation and Strategic Development
 Laboratory "Problems of Organizational and Legal Support of Local Government", The School of Law

Research Centers, Acting on the basis of ChitGU

 Zabaikalsky Center of the Russian Academy of Natural Sciences
 Zabaikalsky Region of the International Academy of Ecology and Life Safety
 Zabaikalsky Branch of Russian Academy of Law Sciences
 Chita regional branch of the International Academy of Pedagogical Science
 Center for Information Technologies in Economics and Management
 Zabaikalsky Regional Office of Russian-Chinese Friendship
 Chita regional department of Russian Lawyers Association

Chita Institute of Far Eastern Branch of Russian Academy of Sciences

Chita Institute of Far Eastern Branch of Russian Academy of Sciences was established in 2005 as a structural unit of ChitSU with the assistance of the Administration of Zabaikalskii Region.

The main goals of Chita branch Institute of Russian Far East Academy of sciences are:
 Integrated study of problems of interaction between Russia with the countries of South-East Asia;
 Conducting basic and applied research (economic, ethnological, philosophical, social, political, etc.);
 Expanding and deepening cooperation in the above areas of academic science and higher education;
 Providing advice, methodical and scientific-educational-informational assistance.

Noting the important role and place of scientific activity in the revitalization and expansion of international relations, as well as in the development of border areas, the main task of Chita branch Institute of Russian Far East Academy of sciences became the task of promoting constructive mutually beneficial cooperation with countries of South-East Asia and foreign participation in research activities.
The Structure of Chita branch Institute of Russian Far East Academy of sciences includes the following sectors: Regional Economic Cooperation; Strategic Studies of regional security; intercultural communication and integration; comparative study of civilizations; legal and managerial problems of interregional interaction; sociological, environmental, religious and linguistic studies.

Student Scientific Societies

 Student Research Laboratory in multimedia, School of Power Engineering
 Student Design Bureau
 Student Center for Legal Research «Прецедентъ»
 Student Design Bureau of The Industrial Processes Automation Department
 Student Design Bureau «Сталкер», Department of Physics and Communications Technology
 Student Design Bureau, Department Metal Technology and Design

International Cooperation and Exchange
Development of scientific and educational relations with foreign institutions of higher education is one of the most important aspects of university policy nowadays, and will be among its priorities in the future. The university's international relations are supervised and conducted by the University Department of International Affairs, established in 1993.

Among the partners of Chita State University are the following Universities and organisations:

South Korea
 Gyeongsang National University, Jinju  - "2+2" Exchange program for students, Exchange program for faculty members.

People's Republic of China
 Shandong Institute of Business and Technology, Yantai  - Exchange and cooperation program;
 Jilin Normal University, Siping  - Exchange and cooperation program;
 Dalian University of Foreign Languages, Dalian 
 Wuhan University, Wuhan 
 Qiqihar University, Qiqihar - "2+2" Exchange program;
 Tianjin International Cultural Institute, Tianjin - Exchange and cooperation program;
 Heilongjiang Science and Technology Institute, Harbin
 University of Inner Mongolia, Manzhouli
 College of the Russian language, Manzhouli
 Beijing vocational college with teaching Chinese as a Foreign Language, Beijing
 Hulunbuir Institute, Hulunbuir

Vietnam
 Hanoi University, Hanoi

Singapore
 Genetic Computer School, Singapore

Ukraine
 National Research Center of Nikitsky Botanical Garden, Yalta
 Slavic State Pedagogical University, Sloviansk
 Donbass State Engineering Academy, Kramatorsk
 National Pedagogical Dragomanov University, Kyiv

Kazakhstan
 Pavlodar State University (named after S. Toraigyrov), Kazakhstan

Mongolia
 Mongolian National University, Ulaanbaatar 
 Institute for the History of the Academy of Sciences of Mongolia, Ulaanbaatar
 Institute of Chemistry and Chemical Technology, Academy of Sciences of Mongolia, Ulaanbaatar

The Republic of Belarus
 Polessky State University, Pinsk

Republic of Moldova
 European University of Moldova, Chisinau

External links

 Chita State University Official
 License and certificate of accreditation
 Chita State University Official
 Russia at euroeducation.net—an outline of the Russian educational system.

Educational institutions established in 1974
Universities and institutes established in the Soviet Union
Chita, Zabaykalsky Krai
Universities in Zabaykalsky Krai
1974 establishments in the Soviet Union
Technical universities and colleges in Russia